Marcos A. Orellana is an international environmental lawyer. He is the incumbent United Nations Human Rights Council Special Rapporteur on toxics and human rights.

Career 
He graduated from  Washington College of Law, and Pontifical Catholic University of Chile.

He teaches at George Washington University Law, and  Washington College of Law.

From 2017 to 2019, he was the Director of the Environment & Human Rights Division of Human Right Watch. 

In 2021, he issued reports on human rights, about hazardous substances. He supported ratification of the Escazú Agreement, He visited Mauritius to observe the aftermath of the Wakashio disaster.

In 2022, he observed the Peruvian oil spill.

In 2022, he issued a Directive on the Sustainable Use of Pesticides .

In 2022, he signed letters about toxic mine waste in Zambia, and Bolivia.

References

External links 
Dr. Marcos A. Orellana ohchr.org

United Nations special rapporteurs

Living people
Year of birth missing (living people)

Environmental lawyers
Washington College of Law alumni
Pontifical Catholic University of Chile alumni
George Washington University Law School faculty
Washington College of Law faculty